Jeeva Rathna also known as R Rathna mononymously as R. Rathnam (16 May 1923 - 9 January 2021) was an Indian music composer  who had worked in Kannada, Tamil,  Malayalam, Hindi, Tulu and Telugu film industry

Career 
Jeeva Rathna entered the Tamil film industry as an actor with Danashura Karna. He didn't get success in acting Later he showed interest in composing music to films and joined as assistant music director Tamil film industry. After getting experience in music he become full-fledged music composer in the movie "Mane Katti Nodu" in 1961starring Uday Kumar, Dwarakish, Meenakumari and others which became hit.

Filmography

Awards
 2013 – Karnataka Rajyotsava Award by Government of Karnataka

References 

Indian musicians
Tamil film score composers
Telugu film score composers
Kannada film score composers
Tamil musicians
2021 deaths
20th-century Indian musicians
Malayalam film score composers
Indian male film score composers
20th-century male musicians
1923 births